Bhojpuri Boys is one of the most popular Bhojpuri musical group in Mauritius. They sang in Bhojpuri language, one of the ancestral languages of Mauritians of Indian origin. The band issued its first album Langaro in 1994.

Singles
Some of their major hits in Mauritius includes;
 Baigun Bagee
 Naiya Sirey (2003)
 Baje Baje
 Damade Baboo
 Hey Langaro (1994)
 Nisa Nisa
 Pot Puri
 Hey dadi
 La France
 Lougarou

References

 

 Mauritius - Culture Smart!: The Essential Guide to Customs & Culture. By Tom Cleary
 Coolitude: An Anthology of the Indian Labour Diaspora. By Marina Carter, Khal Torabully page 213
 Le Malaise Créole: Ethnic Identity in Mauritius. By Rosabelle Boswell page 206
 Numerous google books reference the group as significant. See link to google books search.

Mauritian folk music groups
Mauritian bhojpuri musical groups
Musical groups established in 1994
1994 establishments in Mauritius